Istālif is a village  northwest of Kabul, Afghanistan, situated at an elevation of  in the Shomali Plains, west of Kalakan and south-west of Bagram. It is the center of Istalif District, Kabul Province, Afghanistan. Istalif is famous for its handmade glazed potteries.

Etymology
Its name might derive from Greek staphile ("bunch of grapes") or Parachi estuf ("cow-parsnip").

History

Istalif was always renowned as one of the most beautiful places in Afghanistan – the Emperor Babur fell in love with it in the 16th century and used to hold parties in his rose garden and summer house there. Alexander Burnes, a British political agent to Dost Mohammed in the 19th century, had come here to relax amid the plane and walnut trees. He described that the mountains streams are full of fishes and the orchards and vineyards are richest.

During the final phase of the First Anglo-Afghan War, as General Pollock's Army of Retribution marched into Kabul, many families fled to Istalif. Troops were dispatched, which surrounded the town, attacked, and then systemically pillaged it. The British and Indian soldiers set fire to the cotton cloth of their victims and burnt them alive. They massacred women and children as well.

Until 1998 it was a breadbasket for the region and was surrounded by lush orchards growing grapes, roses and wheat. That year the Taliban came to the village, cutting down trees, burning homes and killing livestock. After destruction, the village has been rebuilding itself after 2002.

Gallery

References

External links

Rehabilitation program
Photo of a highrise in Istalif

Populated places in Parwan Province